Siah Rud (also Romanized as Sīah Rūd, Seyah Rūd, and Sīyah Rūd; also known as Verkhnyaya Siara) is a city in Siah Rud District of Jolfa County, East Azerbaijan province, Iran. At the 2006 census, its population was 1,354 in 366 households. The following census in 2011 counted 1,553 people in 419 households. The latest census in 2016 showed a population of 1,548 people in 470 households.

References 

Jolfa County

Cities in East Azerbaijan Province

Populated places in East Azerbaijan Province

Populated places in Jolfa County